Patrik Gregora (born 6 March 1993) is a Slovak football defender who plays for Slovan Bratislava juniori .

Slovan Bratislava
He made his debut for ŠK Slovan Bratislava against FK Senica on 19 August 2012.

External links
Slovan Bratislava profile

References

1993 births
Living people
Slovak footballers
Association football defenders
ŠK Slovan Bratislava players
FC ŠTK 1914 Šamorín players
FC ViOn Zlaté Moravce players
Slovak Super Liga players
Expatriate footballers in Norway
Footballers from Bratislava